Henry of Castile may refer to:
Henry of Castile the Senator (1230–1304)
Henry I of Castile (1204–1217)
Henry II of Castile (1334–1379)
Henry III of Castile (1379–1406),  Henry the Sufferer or Henry the Infirm
Henry IV of Castile (1425–1474), a.k.a. Henry the Impotent